Jio Payments Bank is an Indian payments bank, which started operating in 2018 and is owned by Reliance Industries. Reliance Industries was granted an in-principle approval by the Reserve Bank of India (RBI) to establish a new payments bank under the Banking Regulation Act, 1949. It then partnered with the State Bank of India and incorporated Jio Payments Bank Limited in November 2016. Jio Payments Bank Limited is a 70:30 partnership between Reliance Industries and State Bank of India.

History
On August 19, 2015 Reliance Industries received a license to run a payments bank from the Reserve Bank of India under Section 22 (1) of the Banking Regulation Act, 1949. On November 10, 2016, it registered as a public limited company to set up a payments bank. On April 3, 2018, Jio Payments Bank became the sixth payment bank to commence operations in India.

References

External links

Indian brands
Payments banks
Banks based in Mumbai
Private sector banks in India
Reliance Industries
Jio Payments Bank
Mobile payments in India
2018 establishments in Maharashtra
Indian companies established in 2018
Payment service providers
Jio